Catoptria spatulellus is a species of moth in the family Crambidae described by Turati in 1919. It is found in the Apennines of  Italy.

References

Moths described in 1919
Crambini
Endemic fauna of Italy
Moths of Europe